Nikolsky is a surname.  Notable people with the name include:

People 
 Alexander A. Nikolsky (1903–1963), American helicopter theoretical pioneer
 Alexander Nikolsky (1858–1942), Soviet zoologist
 Alexandru Nicolschi (1915–1992), Romanian and Soviet communist politician
 Andrei Nikolsky (1959–1995), Russian pianist
 Andronik (Nikolsky) (1870–1918), bishop of the Russian Orthodox Church and a saint
 Boris Nikolsky (1900–1990), Soviet physical chemist and radiochemist
 Konstantin Nikolsky (born 1951), Russian rock musician
 Mikhail Nikolsky (1891–?), Russian historian and founder of assyriology in Russia
 Nikolay Nikolskiy (1877–1959), Russian ethnographer and historian
 Nikolay Nikolsky (1878–1961), Soviet religious historian, orientalist, and academician
 Nikolay Kapitonovich Nikolski (born 1940), Russian mathematician
 Pyotr Nikolsky (1858–1940), Russian dermatologist
 Sergey Nikolskiy, Soviet sprint canoer who competed in the mid to late 1970s
 Sergey Nikolsky (1905–2012), Russian mathematician
 Vladimir Kapitonovich Nikolsky (1894 – 1953), Soviet historian, ethnologist, translator. 

Russian-language surnames